Makvan Rural District is a rural district (dehestan) in Bayangan District, Paveh County, Kermanshah Province, Iran. At the 2006 census, its population was 2,327, in 570 families. The rural district has 9 villages.

References 

Rural Districts of Kermanshah Province
Paveh County